Keli Goff (born July 20, 1979) is an Emmy nominated producer, playwright, screenwriter and journalist. She is a contributor to various news outlets and has written for a number of popular television shows. In 2021 she was announced as one of the writers and producers on And Just Like That..., the reboot of the television series, Sex and the City. She is a contributor and fill-in guest host for public radio's Left, Right & Center.

Early life
A native of Missouri City, Texas, Goff graduated from Elkins High School. She earned a bachelor's degree from New York University and a master's degree in strategic communications from Columbia University.

Early career as a journalist and author

Goff first came to prominence with the publication of her first book, Party Crashing: How the Hip-Hop Generation Declared Political Independence, which examined the perspectives and impact of younger voters and members of the Post Civil Rights Generation on the political process, with particular focus on the 2008 election. The book was notable for containing interviews with younger black voters as well as leaders like Colin Powell and Rev. Al Sharpton. The book resulted in Goff becoming a regular presence on cable news (MSNBC, CNN, FOX) during the 2008 presidential election. She also became a Contributor, covering major events of the election cycle such as the Democratic Convention and election night, on air for BET.

Goff also became a blogger for The Huffington Post. She then became a regular Contributor or Correspondent for various outlets including The Root, The Washington Post blog, "She the People," and eventually The Daily Beast, where she remains a Contributor as of 2021. Her writing was also published in a variety of magazines, including Time, Essence and Cosmopolitan.

Her essay "Living the Dream" is featured in the collection The Speech: Race and Barack Obama's A More Perfect Union in 2009.

In 2011 her first novel, The GQ Candidate, about a group of friends rocked by the decision of one of them to run for president, was published.

Transition to playwriting, screenwriting and producing

In 2013 Goff began working on her first documentary, interviewing pro-life and pro-choice activists about the history of reproductive policy in America. That film would eventually become Reversing Roe, released on Netflix (along with a brief theatrical run) in September 2018. In 2019 Goff, along with directors/fellow producers Ricki Stern and Annie Sundberg, would go on to be nominated for two News/Documentary Emmy Awards for their work on the film.

In 2014 Goff was named one of The Public Theater’s Emerging Writers Group fellows. She wrote her first full length play and performed readings of it at various theaters. Later she had plays workshopped at Crossroads Theater and LAByrinth Theater Company.

In 2014 she was hired to work as a writer on the drama series Being Mary Jane, about a black female cable news anchor. She won a 2016 NAACP Image Award for her writing for the series.

In 2017 Goff began writing for The CW television series Black Lightning (TV series) based on the DC Comics superhero.

In 2019 she served as a writer and producer for the television series Twenties (TV series), produced by Emmy winner Lena Waithe.

Recent career

In 2016 she hosted, "Political Party", a series of specials covering the 2016 election for NPR affiliate, WNYC.

From 2019 to 2021 Goff's columns, articles, and essays have appeared in The Guardian, Vogue, The Hollywood Reporter, The Nation and Town & Country.

In 2020, Goff served as a writer and producer on Joe vs. Carole, the mini-series inspired by The Tiger King, starring Kate McKinnon.

In 2021, Center Stage in Baltimore produced (via streaming, due to the pandemic) Goff's play, The Glorious World of Crowns, Kinks & Curls a collection of scenes and monologues about the relationship between black women and their hair.

In 2021 Goff was also announced as a writer and producer on And Just Like That..., the reboot of the series, Sex and the City. Goff worked as a co-executive producer on the second season of the Paramount+ series Mayor of Kingstown.

Appearances in popular culture

Goff and her work have been covered in publications such as USA Today, Politico and Vanity Fair. Early in her journalism career Goff made hundreds of TV appearances on MSNBC, FOX News Channel, CNN and the BBC among others, and even appeared in a cameo as a political pundit on Being Mary Jane before becoming a writer for the show. During a May 2021 appearance as a storyteller at The Moth, Goff disclosed that she prefers screenwriting and appearing on radio versus appearing on television, because she did not enjoy the overemphasis on her appearance, including her hair, during her TV career. (She also touched upon this in an April 2021 piece for Vogue.). An October 9, 2020 appearance on Real Time with Bill Maher marked a rare recent on camera appearance for Goff, though she continues to appear on air as a Contributor to various NPR affiliates, including KCRW's Left, Right & Center where she also serves as an occasional guest host.

Though best known for covering politics, Goff has written about fashion for various publications including New York magazine  and Town & Country; she is known for her interest in vintage clothing, particularly pieces by historically significant designers of color. Some pieces from her vintage collection are housed in the Texas Fashion Collection.

Goff is also known for her devotion to using a Blackberry, which she has referenced in interviews and on social media.

References

External links
 Official site
 CNN, December 30, 2008
 Washington Post, January 5, 2008
 Vanity Fair, March 2008
 

1979 births
21st-century American essayists
21st-century American journalists
21st-century American novelists
21st-century American women writers
African-American bloggers
American bloggers
African-American journalists
African-American non-fiction writers
African-American novelists
African-American screenwriters
African-American television personalities
African-American women in politics
African-American women journalists
African-American women writers
American columnists
American television writers
American women bloggers
American women essayists
American women novelists
American women screenwriters
American political commentators
American political writers
Columbia University alumni
Journalists from Texas
Living people
New York University alumni
Novelists from Texas
People associated with the 2008 United States presidential election
People from Missouri City, Texas
Screenwriters from Texas
Television personalities from Texas
American women columnists
American women television personalities
American women television writers
21st-century American screenwriters
21st-century African-American women
21st-century African-American people
20th-century African-American people
20th-century African-American women